Ösmo is a locality situated in Nynäshamn Municipality, Stockholm County, Sweden with 3,911 inhabitants in 2010. It has a station on the Stockholm commuter rail network, Nynäshamn line (Nynäsbanan).

References 

There is a very old church here. The centre is modern and uninteresting, with a school, supermarket, petrol station, a couple of pizza restaurants, a handelsbanken bank and a discount store. The surrounding nature includes forest and a lake, called Muskan. A full-sized golf course and hotel lies just a few KM from the town centre.

Populated places in Nynäshamn Municipality